C Train may refer to:
 CTrain in Calgary, Alberta, Canada
 C (New York City Subway service)
 Green Line C branch, of the Massachusetts Bay Transportation Authority
 MTR C-Stock EMU in Hong Kong
 C-train, a type of road train
C Line (Los Angeles Metro), a light rail line in Los Angeles County, California

See also
 Line C (disambiguation)